Angostylis is a genus of flowering plants in the family Euphorbiaceae, first described in 1854. The genus is native to northern South America (Suriname and northern Brazil).

, there are two species in the genus Angostylis:
 Angostylis longifolia Benth. – northern Brazil
 Angostylis tabulamontana Croizat – Suriname

References

Plukenetieae
Euphorbiaceae genera
Flora of South America